75 Tauri is a single, orange-hued star in the zodiac of constellation Taurus. It is a dim star but visible to the naked eye with an apparent visual magnitude of 4.96. Based upon an annual parallax shift of 17.47 mas as seen from Earth's orbit, it is located around 187 light years away. Due to its position near the ecliptic, it is subject to lunar occultations. The star is moving further from the Sun with a heliocentric radial velocity of +16 km/s.

The stellar classification of 75 Tauri is K1 IIIb, indicating it is an aging giant star that has exhausted the supply of hydrogen at its core. At the estimated age of roughly 2.7 billion years, this has become a red clump star that is generating energy through helium fusion in its core region. The star has 1.5 times the mass of the Sun and has expanded to 11 times the Sun's radius. It is radiating 41 times the Sun's luminosity from its enlarged photosphere at an effective temperature of around 4,697 K.

References

K-type giants
Horizontal-branch stars
Suspected variables
Taurus (constellation)
Durchmusterung objects
Tauri, 075
028292
020877
1407